Hiatt Comes Alive at Budokan? was singer-songwriter John Hiatt's twelfth album and first live album, released in 1994. The album was actually recorded at venues in North America; the title parodies both Peter Frampton's Frampton Comes Alive! and the At Budokan albums released by numerous artists, most famously by Cheap Trick in 1978.

Hiatt is backed on this album by the Guilty Dogs, which was recorded on the tour supporting Perfectly Good Guitar.

Track listing
All tracks written by John Hiatt except where noted

"Through Your Hands" – 4:14
"Real Fine Love" – 4:59
"Memphis In The Meantime" – 4:38
"Icy Blue Heart" – 5:42
"Paper Thin" – 4:29
"Angel Eyes" – 4:54 (Hiatt, Fred Koller)
"Your Dad Did" – 5:35
"Have A Little Faith In Me" – 4:17
"Drive South" – 5:02
"Thing Called Love" – 5:50
"Perfectly Good Guitar" – 5:43
"Feels Like Rain" – 6:21
"Tennessee Plates" – 4:06 (Hiatt, Mike Porter)
"Lipstick Sunset" – 5:31
"Slow Turning" – 4:51

Personnel
John Hiatt – vocals, Rhythm guitar, Piano

The Guilty Dogs
Michael Ward – Electric guitar, Background Vocals
Davey Faragher – Bass guitar, Background Vocals
Michael Urbano – drums, Associate Producer

References

Albums produced by Matt Wallace
A&M Records live albums
1994 live albums
John Hiatt albums